Ranchos Penitas West is a census-designated place (CDP) in Webb County, Texas, United States. The population was 573 at the 2010 census.

Geography
Ranchos Penitas (Cesar Cardenas) West is located at  (27.673466, -99.605590).

According to the United States Census Bureau in 2000, the CDP has a total area of 4.7 square miles (12.0 km2), all of it land. This CDP lost area in the changes in Webb County prior to the 2010 census.

Demographics
As of the census of 2000, there were 520 people, 114 households, and 104 families residing in the CDP. The population density was 111.7 people per square mile (43.2/km2). There were 152 housing units at an average density of 32.7/sq mi (12.6/km2). The racial makeup of the CDP was 88.85% White, 0.77% African American, 0.38% Native American, 9.81% from other races, and 0.19% from two or more races. Hispanic or Latino peopleof any race were 94.23% of the population.

There were 114 households, out of which 66.7% had children under the age of 18 living with them, 78.1% were married couples living together, 9.6% had a female householder with no husband present, and 7.9% were non-families. 6.1% of all households were made up of individuals, and 2.6% had someone living alone who was 65 years of age or older. The average household size was 4.56 and the average family size was 4.71.

In the CDP, the population was spread out, with 44.2% under the age of 18, 8.3% from 18 to 24, 28.8% from 25 to 44, 12.9% from 45 to 64, and 5.8% who were 65 years of age or older. The median age was 23 years. For every 100 females, there were 107.2 males. For every 100 females age 18 and over, there were 104.2 males.

The median income for a household in the CDP was $23,681, and the median income for a family was $24,097. Males had a median income of $22,955 versus $14,107 for females. The per capita income for the CDP was $6,236. About 25.3% of families and 30.2% of the population were below the poverty line, including 29.6% of those under age 18 and 52.2% of those age 65 or over.

Education
The community is served by the United Independent School District. Zoned schools include: Julia Bird Jones Muller Elementary School, George Washington Middle School, United High School.

The designated community college for Webb County is Laredo Community College.

References

Census-designated places in Webb County, Texas
Census-designated places in Texas